Arthur Sellers (31 May 1870 – 25 September 1941) was an English amateur first-class cricketer, who played for Yorkshire County Cricket Club from 1890 to 1899, and in other first-class matches for the North of England (1893) and Gentlemen of England (1895).

Born in Keighley, Yorkshire, Sellers, in 53 first-class games, scored 1,852 runs at 19.91, hitting two centuries against Middlesex and Somerset.  Sellers took 47 catches and two wickets, at 74.50.  Both victims came in a spell of 2 for 28 against Kent.

Sellers died in Keighley in September 1941.

His son, Brian Sellers, was Yorkshire captain from 1933 to 1947, and a Wisden Cricketer of the Year in 1940.

References

External links

1870 births
1941 deaths
Yorkshire cricketers
Gentlemen of England cricketers
Cricketers from Keighley
English cricketers
North v South cricketers
English cricketers of 1890 to 1918